The National Museum Machado de Castro is an art museum in Coimbra, Portugal, named after the renowned Portuguese sculptor Joaquim Machado de Castro. It first opened in 1913 and its latest renovation (2004-2012), which included the addition of a new building, was awarded the Piranesi/Prix de Rome Prize 2014.

Building
The museum is housed in the former Bishop's Palace. This palace was built from the Middle Ages onwards roughly on the site where the Roman forum of Aeminium (Coimbra's Roman name) once stood. The remains of this distant past, the Cryptoporticus, can be visited on the lower floors of the museum.

Collections
The bulk of the museum's collection is made up of items from churches and religious institutions in the area surrounding Coimbra. The collections of sculpture (the most extensive of all the national museums of Portugal), painting, precious metals, ceramics and textiles are especially noteworthy.

Archaeology

Sculpture

Paintings

Applied arts

References

External links
 Official site
 
The Machado de Castro National Museum on Google Arts & Culture

Culture in Coimbra
Art museums and galleries in Portugal
Machado de Castro
Machado de Castro, Joaquim
National museums of Portugal
Tourist attractions in Coimbra
Museums in Coimbra District
National monuments in Coimbra District